is a 1975 Japanese experimental short film directed by Toshio Matsumoto. The film depicts a figure sitting in an outdoor environment and wearing a robe and a Hannya mask. The film features receding and shifting images captured in a frame-by-frame manner; though these shots resemble zooms and pans, they were actually derived from positioning the camera on a series of a points.

Reception
In 1978, a writer for the Millennium Film Journal called Ātman "an intricately constructed film", and compared it to Michael Snow's Wavelength (1967) and Hollis Frampton's Travelling Matte (1973).

The techniques Matsumoto used in this film were influential on his student Takashi Ito.

References

Bibliography

External links
 

1975 films
1975 short films
Japanese short films
Films directed by Toshio Matsumoto